Perëndi is an Albanian noun for God, deity, sky and heaven. It is used capitalized to refer to the Supreme Being, and uncapitalized for "deity", "sky" and "heaven".

Name

Description 
In Albanian, Perëndí (definite: Perëndía) is the name of God, the sky and heaven, and is used capitalized to refer to the Supreme Being. The plural indefinite form is perëndí while the plural definite form is perëndítë, used uncapitalized to refer to the deities. Some dialectal alternative forms include: Perendí, Perenní, Perondí, Perundí, Perudí, Perndí and Parandí.

The word perëndi(a) is attested in Old Albanian literature, firstly mentioned by Luca Matranga in the late 16th century and Bishop Pjetër Budi in the early 17th century, included into the text of the Albanian translation of the Pater Noster. However it never appears in the works of the earliest Albanian author, Gjon Buzuku, who translate Deus always using the noun Zot with the compound Zotynë or Ynëzot (Zot-ynë, ynë-Zot "our Lord/God"), even translating the Latin Dominus Deus with the word Zotynë only. The noun Zotynë / Ynëzot, along with its inflections in the different grammatical cases , was commonly used in the Old Albanian language of the literature in northern Albania as well as in the Albanian colonies in Greece and Italy. Another old noun to refer to the Deity was Hyj, a nonderivative equivalent of Deus that has been characterized as "a half-pagan word" and "a rare stylistic variant" used "poetically" instead of the noun Perëndi(a). However the noun Hyj appears in Old Albanian literature only in the works of Bishop Pjetër Bogdani.

The early meaning of the word perëndi(a) was usually different from the present one, as it does not generally occur in Old Albanian literature used as a name of the Deity. Although Budi reports atinë Perëndi ("father God"), he translates the Latin phrase Regnum tuum as perëndia jote in Albanian. Bishop Frang Bardhi translates Caesar as Perëndi. Bishop Pjetër Bogdani translates from Italian to Albanian l' imperatore di Turchia ("the emperor of Turkey") as Perëndia i Turqisë and quattro Monarchie ("four kingdoms/monarchies") as katër Perëndija. The common usage of perëndi(a) for "Deity" is almost certainly a later phenomenon.

It is a pan-Albanian word. In Myzeqe in central Albania a village is named Perondí, and in Bosnia and Herzegovina it is used in the family name Perèndija. The Albanians of Ukraine use Parandí for "God" and parandítë for "gods". The word perëndi means "heaven, sky" in some Albanian dialects, with both direct and figurative meanings. A typical example is an Albanian popular phrase gruri gjer mbë perëndi ("a pile of grain up to the skies"). As a name of God Perëndi(a) has been recognised by all Albanians already since the 19th century. However it has been mainly used as a feminine noun. It contains the stressed -i, which is the typical suffix of abstract nouns in the Albanian language. Other examples are dijeni(a) ("knowledge"), trimëri(a) ("bravery"), madhëri(a) ("majesty"). Since they belong to the declension type which is characteristic to feminine nouns in Albanian, they are normally of feminine gender. It is difficult to infer whether Albanian speakers and writers relate the noun Perëndi(a) with the concept of a personal God or a half-abstract and impersonal "deity", but in general usage in the Albanian language outside the Bible translations the noun Perëndi tends to be less personal than the noun Zot.

Etymology 
The origin of the Albanian noun Perëndi is obscure. Several etymologies have been proposed by scholars:

From an Albanian compound of the roots per-en- ("to strike') and -dí ("sky, god"). The Proto-Indo-European theonymic roots *dei- ("to shine") and *perkwu-s ("sky/rain/oak associations") may be grouped together under the classifications of "celestial luminosity". Some scholars consider Perëndi to have been a sky and thunder god in the Albanian pagan mythology, and to have been a deity presumably worshiped by the Illyrians in antiquity. As such, in some of his attributes Perëndi could be related to the Albanian weather and storm gods Shurdh and Verbt, and to the mythological demigod drangue. An Albanian attested sky and lightning god is Zojz, from PIE Dyeus (Daylight-Sky-God).
From the Albanian verb perëndoj ("to set of the sun"), ultimately derived from Latin parentari, the passive correlate of parentare ("a sacrifice to the dead, to satisfy"). This etymology could relate the word perëndi with the ancient Albanian Sun cult.

Usage in folk beliefs

Lightning and thunder-stones 

In Albanian folk beliefs the lightning was regarded as the "fire of the sky" (zjarri i qiellit) and was considered the "weapon of the deity" (arma/pushka e perëndisë), indeed an Albanian word to refer to the lightning is rrufeja, related to the Thracian rhomphaia, an ancient pole weapon. Albanians believed in the supreme powers of thunder-stones (kokrra e rrufesë or guri i rejës), which were believed to be formed during lightning strikes and to be fallen from the sky. Thunder-stones were preserved in family life as important cult objects. It was believed that bringing them inside the house could bring good fortune, prosperity and progress in people, in livestock and in agriculture, or that rifle bullets would not hit the owners of the thunder-stones. A common practice was to hung a thunder-stone pendant on the body of the cattle or on the pregnant woman for good luck and to contrast the evil eye.

In Albanian culture, the heaviest type of oath swearing (Alb. beja më e rëndë) is taken by a thunder-stone "which comes from the sky" (beja me gur/kokërr reje/rrufeje që vjen nga perëndia). It was a very serious oath and people were afraid of it even though they were telling the truth. The act of absolving himself of any allegation of theft was performed in the following way: the thunder-stone was taken in the left hand and was touched by the right hand saying:

Rainmaking 
The word perëndi is especially invoked by Albanians in incantations and songs praying for rain. Rituals were performed in times of summer drought to make it rain, usually in June and July, but sometimes also in the spring months when there was severe drought. In different Albanian regions, for rainmaking purpose, people threw water upwards to make it subsequently fall to the ground in the form of rain. This was an imitative type of magic practice with ritual songs.

In Nowruz or in the Albanian Spring Day (Dita e Verës), in particular, in some villages of the region of Kurvelesh in southern Albania people addressed the following prayer to the deity for plants and cattle:

In rainmaking ritual songs from southwestern Albania, people used to pray to the Sun, invoking the names Dielli, Shën Dëlliu, Ilia or Perëndia. After repeating three times the invocation song, they used to say: Do kemi shi se u nxi Shëndëlliu ("We will have rain because the Holy Sun went dark").

Fate deities 
Among the Albanians of Ukraine there is a belief about the determination of a child's fate by the parandí(të) "gods/deities". The belief is referred in the local Albanian dialect as Parandítë të gjithtë búnë rasredelít meaning "Everything is Assigned by the Gods/Deities".

See also

Albanian folk beliefs
Illyrian religion
En (deity)
Zojz (deity)
Prende
Drangue

References

Notes

Citations

Bibliography

.

Albanian mythology
Albanian folklore
Thunder gods
Illyrian gods
Paleo-Balkan mythology